The Marine Special Operations Group (also known as the Force Reconnaissance Group), formerly known as the Force Recon Battalion, is the Philippine Marine Corps' elite special forces unit for unconventional warfare and special operations. 

It specializes in sea, air and land operations, like its counterpart in the Naval Special Operations Command of the Philippine Navy, ranging from reconnaissance, close combat, demolition, intelligence and underwater operations in support to the overall naval operations.

History
The MSOG was established on August 19, 1972, which was first known as the 1st Reconnaissance Unit, Recon Company.

As part of the ongoing expansion and modernization of the entire Armed Forces, the FRB was officially renamed in April 2018 as the Marine Special Operations Group. Plans are ongoing to expand the unit's capabilities.

Training
All Force Recon Marines are usually airborne and Scout Ranger qualified and most importantly; must finish the Force Reconnaissance Course to qualify.

Like most of the AFP special operations units, the best members of Force Recon Battalion are handpicked to undergo VIP security training and assigned to the Presidential Security Group.

Units
HQ and Training Company
Four Recon Companies
61st Reconnaissance Company
62nd Reconnaissance Company
63rd Reconnaissance Company
64th Reconnaissance Company

References

Special forces of the Philippines
Battalions of the Philippines
Philippine Marine Corps